Penantly Creek is a stream in the U.S. state of Mississippi.

Penantly is a name derived from the Choctaw language purported to mean either (sources vary) "boat landing place" or "ferry".

References

Rivers of Mississippi
Rivers of Jasper County, Mississippi
Mississippi placenames of Native American origin